Two years after the end of the Estonian War of Independence (1918-1920), the Estonian Army consisted of 3 field divisions and a number of small independent battalions and companies (1922).

The Republic of Estonia consisted of 47,750 km2 of territory, with a population of 1,107,000 inhabitants. The armed forces was made up of 18,000 men. In the opinion of the Lithuanian armed forces General Staff, the army was large enough to defend The Republic of Estonia. Estonia's geographical position was well-suited for military purposes - two large lakes were useful natural obstacles. Conscripts served for was 18 months in the infantry, 24 months in other parts of the army, and 36 months in the Navy. Estonian military also had 105,000 in reserve force which would have been mobilized if a war would have started.

Infantry

1st division
Regiment (2 battalions)
Regiment (2 battalions)
2nd division
Regiment (2 battalions)
Regiment (2 battalions)
Detached battalion
3rd division
Regiment (2 battalions)
Detached battalion

Infantry Organization

The army had 12 line battalions. Every battalion consisted of:

 3 line (infantry) companies of 3 platoons of 2 squads
 Machine gun company
 Technical company
 Cavalry platoon for recognition
The infantry was using Russian and English made rifles. The accoutrements and ammunition of their weapons were American made. Two battalions make a regiment in peacetime. After the mobilization, every battalion become regiment.

Comparison of companies

Artillery

There were 3 regiments of light artillery of 4 batteries everyone for every Infantry division. There were 2 groups of heavy artillery like separate units. Every battery had 4 guns. Most part of the guns - 3 inches Russian guns. There were some English, French and German guns. In that time Estonia had enough guns to make artillery two times larger.

Cavalry

 Hussars regiment: 
 2 line squadrons
 Mg's squadrons

The Estonian military included two regular Hussar cavalry regiments, as well as six cavalry squadrons that could be called up as part of the reserve army.

Two Estonian cavalry regiments participated in the Estonian War of Independence, along with smaller cavalry formations; every infantry regiment had one reconnaissance cavalry attachment. By the end of the war, another cavalry regiment, the Cavalry Reserve Regiment, was formed in Tallinn, and functioned as a cavalry school for soldiers and officers. The Estonian 2nd Cavalry Regiment was dissolved in 1920.

Despite several attempts by the Estonian Defence Forces to modernize its cavalry, the units could not keep up with the technological advances of the 1930s and the rapid development of armoured warfare. While already declining before World War II, the remaining Estonian cavalry regiments were abolished and attached to the Soviet 22nd Rifle Corps on 10 September 1940.

There have been no cavalry units in the modern Estonian Ground Forces since Estonian independence in 1991.

Technical Formations

Armoured brigade
3 armoured trains (with light artillery guns and machine guns)
1 armoured train (narrow gauge)
Column of Armoured cars (16)
Tanks company (4 heavy and 10 light tanks) – Mark V and Renault FT

Armoured trains had an important role in Estonian War of Independence. They were used very effectively in supporting Latvians in fighting against Bermontians in Latvian War of Independence.
Technical battalion
Railway company
Engineering company
Signal company
Training company

Aviation
3 squadrons – 34 planes and hydroplanes

The Navy

EML Lembit (former Bobr; Bieber) (gun boat; scrapped 1927)
EML Lennuk (former Avtroil) (destroyer; sold to Peru in 1933; later Almirante Guise)
EML Wambola (former Kapitan 2. ranga Kingsbergen; Kapitan 1. ranga Miklukho-Maklay; Spartak) (destroyer; sold to Peru in 1933; later Almirante Villar)
EML Ristna (minesweeper)
EML Suurop (minesweeper)
EML Sulev (torpedo gunboat)
EML Kalev (submarine)
EML Lembit (submarine)

Training
Central school of NCOs.
Military technical school - Cadets (2 years) and officers (short courses).
Military school – Preparing candidates for officer corps to The Army (3 years course). Here studying young men receive the lieutenant rank after graduation.
General staff courses (from 1921) in Tallinn - One year-long course for senior officers to prepare for work in The General Staff. It had 15 students in 1921.

See also
Estonian Military units
Estonian Minister of Defence
Finnish–Estonian defense cooperation
Suurtükiväegrupp

References